In February 2008, Rabbi Menachem Froman, chief rabbi of Tekoa in the West Bank, and Khaled Amayreh, a journalist close to Hamas, reached an agreement for an Israeli-Hamas ceasefire in the Gaza Strip that would put an immediate end to all Palestinian attacks against Israeli civilians or soldiers, facilitate the release of abducted Israeli soldier Gilad Shalit, and end the Israeli siege of the Gaza Strip. Senior Hamas officials have endorsed the agreement. The Israeli government, however, has not responded to this initiative, effectively rejecting it.

Froman and Amayreh drafted the agreement after meeting over the course of several months. The agreement was finalized and shown to Hamas leaders in Gaza and Hamas leader-in-exile Khaled Meshal who approved of the agreement. The agreement was also submitted to the Israeli government but according to Froman, the Israeli government never responded to it. The efforts of Froman and Amayreh to meet with Israeli government officials were rebuffed.

The agreement calls for Israel to lift economic sanctions imposed on the Gaza Strip and open all border crossings. The cease-fire agreement includes the release of abducted Israeli soldier Gilad Shalit, and a gradual release of Palestinian prisoners. The Israel Defense Forces would end "all hostile activities toward the Gaza Strip, including targeted killings, the setting of ambushes, aerial bombardments and all penetrations into Gazan territory, in addition to ending the arrest, detention and persecution of Palestinians in the Strip."

The Palestinians would be obligated "to take all the necessary steps to completely end the attacks against Israel," including stopping "indefinitely all rocket attacks on Israel," assaults "on Israeli civilians and soldiers" and "to impose a cease-fire on all groups, factions and individuals operating in the Strip."

Froman and Amayreh say that even if the attempt turns out to be merely an academic exercise, its elements could be used by the Jerusalem and Gaza governments. It does not, for example, include the recognition by Hamas of the State of Israel, instead "recognizing that there are Jews living in the Holy Land," according to Froman, thus overcoming an obstacle that has long been a deal-breaker.

Text of the agreement
The text of the agreement is:

In the Name of God, the Gracious, the Merciful  
 
The following is the text of the proposed ceasefire agreement:  

Subject: General outlines of a prospective Hudna or Truce between the government of 
Israel and the Palestinian Authorities in Gaza 
 
Date: January, 2008 
 
 
Pursuant to this agreement, Israel and the Palestinian authorities in Gaza shall carry out the following obligations: 
 

I. Israeli obligations
1. Terminate and immediately lift all sanctions against the Gaza Strip. This includes the following:
a.     Allowing  normal economic activities between Gaza and the outside world.
b.     Re-opening all border crossings between Gaza and the outside world, including allowing normal travel movement as well as the flow of goods and services from and to the Strip.
c.     Israel shall refrain from using security pretexts to harass, punish Gaza or re-impose sanctions, partially or fully.
d.     Israel shall move immediately to terminate the financial blockade on the Gaza Strip and allow normal financial transactions between the Gaza Strip and the outside world.
2. Israel shall immediately cease all hostilities against the Gaza Strip, including the following:
a.     Cessation of all targeted killings and ambush, cessation of all aerial bombings, cessation of all incursions into Gaza, cessation of all arrests, detentions and hounding of Palestinians in the Gaza Strip.

II. Palestinian obligations: 
The Authorities in the Gaza Strip would undertake to put an end to all attacks of any kind against Israel. This includes the following:
a.   An immediate cessation of all attacks and firings of projectiles against Israel.
b.   The authorities in the Gaza Strip undertake to impose a ceasefire on all groups and factions and individuals operating within the Gaza Strip.
c.   The authorities in the Gaza Strip shall be held responsible for violations.
 
III. Verification: 
This implementation of this agreement can be monitored and verified by a third party, subject to mutual consent.

IV. The agreement must be approved by the Palestinian Authority leadership in 
Ramallah, preferably by Mahmoud Abbas, Abu Mazen.

References

Israeli–Palestinian peace process